Odoardo Cibo or Odoardo Cybo (6 December 1619 – 6 April 1705) was a Roman Catholic prelate who served as Titular Patriarch of Constantinople (1689–1705), Apostolic Nuncio to Switzerland (1670–1679), and Titular Archbishop of Seleucia in Isauria (1670–1689).

Biography
Odoardo Cibo was born in Massa, Italy on 6 December 1619.
On 28 July 1670, he was appointed during the papacy of Pope Clement X as Titular Archbishop of Seleucia in Isauria.
On 11 August 1670, he was appointed during the papacy of Pope Clement X as Apostolic Nuncio to Switzerland. He resigned as Apostolic Nuncio to Switzerland in 1679.
On 13 October 1689, he was appointed during the papacy of Pope Alexander VIII as Titular Patriarch of Constantinople.
He served as Titular Patriarch of Constantinople until his death on 6 April 1705.

Episcopal succession

References

External links and additional sources
 (for Chronology of Bishops) 
 (for Chronology of Bishops) 
 (for Chronology of Bishops) 
 (for Chronology of Bishops) 
 (for Chronology of Bishops) 
 (for Chronology of Bishops) 

17th-century Italian Roman Catholic titular archbishops
Bishops appointed by Pope Clement X
Bishops appointed by Pope Alexander VIII
1619 births
1705 deaths